Manjit Dale (born June 1965) is a London-based businessman. He founded TDR Capital with Stephen Robertson in 2002. It is located on Bentinck Street in Marylebone, central London.

Dale attended the University of Cambridge where he studied economics.

References

1965 births
Living people
Alumni of the University of Cambridge
British businesspeople